Oncideres lyside is a species of beetle in the family Cerambycidae. It was described by Dillon and Dillon in 1949. It is known from Panama.

References

lyside
Beetles described in 1949